Begonia dentatobracteata is a species of plant in the family Begoniaceae. It is endemic to China.

References

dentatobracteata
Endemic flora of China
Vulnerable plants
Taxonomy articles created by Polbot